Kuan Tai (Traditional Chinese: 關帝文化) is a Macau football club, which plays in Macao. The team have been withdrawn from the Macau's first division, the Campeonato da 1ª Divisão do Futebol in 2014.

Achievements
Macau Championship: 0

Football clubs in Macau